The 2018 British Grand Prix (formally known as the Formula 1 2018 Rolex British Grand Prix) was a Formula One motor race held on 8 July 2018 at the Silverstone Circuit in Silverstone, United Kingdom. The race was the 10th round of the 2018 Formula One World Championship. It marked the 73rd running of the British Grand Prix, the 69th time that the race had been run as a World Championship event, and the 52nd time that the World Championship event had been held at the Silverstone Circuit.

Ferrari driver Sebastian Vettel entered the race with a one-point lead over Lewis Hamilton in the Drivers' Championship. In the Constructors' Championship, Ferrari led Mercedes by ten points.

Report

Background

The circuit featured three drag reduction system (DRS) zones. The two used in previous years – positioned on the Wellington and Hangar Straights – returned, with a third zone placed on the pit straight. As DRS is deactivated when the driver brakes, drivers were able to use the system through the Abbey and Farm corners as these corners could be taken flat-out when the car is low on fuel. This brought increased risk as DRS reduces drag by cancelling out aerodynamic grip at a time when aerodynamic grip improves the car's ability to take corners at speed. Drivers were able to manually deactivate DRS before the corners if they were unable or unwilling to take the corner with the use of DRS. The race marked the first time that drivers were able to use DRS through corners in a race. The decision to allow the use of DRS through the corners drew criticism as drivers felt that using DRS through Abbey corner was unsafe. Drivers found the best approach was to manually deactivate DRS before the corner without slowing before reactivating it on the corner exit. This approach was necessary as slowing the car would prevent the system from being reactivated.

Practice 
The first practice session saw Romain Grosjean crash at Abbey, after he left his DRS open whilst taking the corner, and Max Verstappen stopped on the pit straight with a gearbox issue. In second practice, Verstappen crashed at Luffield and Pierre Gasly's Toro Rosso broke down. In third practice, Brendon Hartley had a heavy crash after his front left suspension failed at high speed.

Qualifying 
Q1 was red flagged as Lance Stroll went into the gravel and his car had to be removed. After an early showing from Ferrari, Hamilton took pole, his 6th around Silverstone. Ferrari qualified 2nd and 3rd, with Valtteri Bottas 4th. Hartley missed qualifying after the heavy crash in FP3, and started from the pit lane, along with Stroll and Sergey Sirotkin. Charles Leclerc made Q3 for the second time, qualifying in P9.

Race 
Hamilton had a slow start and was jumped by Vettel and Bottas. At Turn 3, Kimi Räikkönen made contact with Hamilton, spinning him off the track and into last. Sergio Pérez also spun at the start, narrowly avoiding the Williams cars exiting the pit lane. Hartley failed to exit the pit lane. Räikkönen was given a 10-second time penalty for causing the collision between himself and Hamilton, which he served in the pits on lap 14. On lap 19, Leclerc retired after exiting the pits with a loose wheel. On lap 32, Marcus Ericsson crashed at Abbey, after failing to deactivate his DRS quick enough. This brought out a safety car, and both Ferraris and both Red Bulls pitted for a 2nd time, for the soft tyres. Mercedes chose to leave their drivers out to gain track position. On lap 38, Grosjean and Carlos Sainz crashed at Copse, causing another safety car. On lap 46, Verstappen spun and subsequently retired with a brake by wire issue. The next lap, Vettel overtook Bottas for the lead of the race, which he kept until the chequered flag, making it his second victory at Silverstone, the first since 2009. Vettel became the first Ferrari driver to win at Silverstone since Fernando Alonso in 2011. Vettel's win broke Mercedes's 5-race winning streak at the British Grand Prix.

Classification

Qualifying

Notes
  – Sergey Sirotkin was required to start from the pit lane after changing his rear wing.
  – Lance Stroll failed to set a lap time during qualifying. He was allowed to race at the stewards' discretion. He was required to start from the pit lane after changing his rear wing.
  – Brendon Hartley did not take part in qualifying after crashing in FP3. He was allowed to race at the stewards' discretion. He was required to start from the pit lane after changing his chassis.

Race 

Notes
  – Pierre Gasly originally finished 10th, but received a 5-second penalty for causing a collision.
  – Max Verstappen retired from the race, but was classified as he completed more than 90% of the race distance.

Championship standings after the race

Drivers' Championship standings

Constructors' Championship standings

 Note: Only the top five positions are included for both sets of standings.

See also
 2018 Silverstone Formula 2 round
 2018 Silverstone GP3 Series round

References

External links

British
British Grand Prix
Grand Prix
British Grand Prix
Grand Prix